Martin Henriksen (born 25 January 1980 in Tårnby) is a Danish politician and former MP, representing the Dansk Folkeparti from 8 February 2005 to 5 June 2019 in various constituencies.

Political career
He is known as a strong critic of Immigration policy in Denmark.  He is one of the more anti-Muslim politicians in the DF, having previously claimed on his website that Islam "has since its inception been a terrorist movement".

His party lost a lot of seats in parliament in the 2019 Danish general elections.

References

Danish People's Party politicians
Politicians from Copenhagen
1980 births
Living people
People from Tårnby Municipality
Members of the Folketing 2005–2007
Members of the Folketing 2007–2011
Members of the Folketing 2011–2015
Members of the Folketing 2015–2019